This is a list of the Australian moth species of the family Gelechiidae. It also acts as an index to the species articles and forms part of the full List of moths of Australia.

Anacampsinae
Aproaerema coracina (Meyrick, 1921)
Aproaerema isoscelixantha (Lower, 1897)
Aproaerema simplexella (Walker, 1864)
Chaliniastis astrapaea Meyrick, 1904
Idiophantis chiridota Meyrick, 1914
Idiophantis habrias Meyrick, 1904
Idiophantis insomnis (Meyrick, 1904)
Pauroneura brachysticha Turner, 1919
Scindalmota limata Turner, 1919
Thiotricha acronipha Turner, 1919
Thiotricha animosella (Walker, 1864)
Thiotricha anticentra Meyrick, 1904
Thiotricha argyrea Turner, 1919
Thiotricha arthrodes Meyrick, 1904
Thiotricha atractodes Meyrick, 1922
Thiotricha bullata Meyrick, 1904
Thiotricha chrysopa Meyrick, 1904
Thiotricha complicata Meyrick, 1918
Thiotricha hemiphaea Turner, 1919
Thiotricha leucothona Meyrick, 1904
Thiotricha margarodes Meyrick, 1904
Thiotricha niphastis Meyrick, 1904
Thiotricha oxytheces Meyrick, 1904
Thiotricha panglycera Turner, 1919
Thiotricha paraconta Meyrick, 1904
Thiotricha parthenica Meyrick, 1904
Thiotricha prosoestea Turner, 1919
Epiphthora achnias Meyrick, 1904
Epiphthora acrocola Turner, 1927
Epiphthora acropasta Turner, 1919
Epiphthora anisaula (Meyrick, 1921)
Epiphthora autoleuca Meyrick, 1904
Epiphthora belonodes Meyrick, 1904
Epiphthora chionocephala (Lower, 1901)
Epiphthora coniombra Meyrick, 1904
Epiphthora cryolopha Meyrick, 1904
Epiphthora delochorda Lower, 1918
Epiphthora dinota (Turner, 1933)
Epiphthora drosias Meyrick, 1904
Epiphthora harpastis Meyrick, 1904
Epiphthora hexagramma (Meyrick, 1921)
Epiphthora hyperaenicta Turner, 1927
Epiphthora isonira Meyrick, 1904
Epiphthora lemurella Meyrick, 1904
Epiphthora leptoconia Turner, 1919
Epiphthora leucomichla Meyrick, 1904
Epiphthora megalornis Meyrick, 1904
Epiphthora miarodes Meyrick, 1904
Epiphthora microtima Meyrick, 1904
Epiphthora niphaula Meyrick, 1904
Epiphthora phantasta Meyrick, 1904
Epiphthora poliopasta Turner, 1919
Epiphthora psychrodes Meyrick, 1904
Epiphthora spectrella Meyrick, 1904
Epiphthora thyellias Meyrick, 1904
Epiphthora zalias (Meyrick, 1922)
Aristotelia antipala Meyrick, 1904
Aristotelia aphthoropa Turner, 1939
Aristotelia centrosema (Lower, 1893)
Aristotelia clavata Meyrick, 1914
Aristotelia crypsixantha Turner, 1919
Aristotelia epicharta Turner, 1919
Aristotelia epimetalla Meyrick, 1904
Aristotelia eurypsola Turner, 1919
Aristotelia furtiva Meyrick, 1904
Aristotelia hemisarca Lower, 1916
Aristotelia iomarmara Meyrick, 1921
Aristotelia ivae Busck, 1900
Aristotelia macrothecta Meyrick, 1904
Aristotelia ochrostephana Turner, 1933
Aristotelia pamphaea Meyrick, 1904
Aristotelia sinistra Meyrick, 1904
Aristotelia sticheris Turner, 1919
Aristotelia tetracosma Meyrick, 1904
Aristotelia themerastis Turner, 1919
Aristotelia thetica Meyrick, 1904
Aristotelia turbida Turner, 1919
Catameces peribapta (Lower, 1918)
Deltophora peltosema (Lower, 1900)
Dorycnopa heliochares (Lower, 1900)
Dorycnopa marmorea (Lower, 1899)
Dorycnopa orthodesma (Lower, 1901)
Dorycnopa triphera Lower, 1920
Iulota bacillum (Turner, 1927)
Iulota epispila (Lower, 1897)
Iulota ischnora Turner, 1919
Iulota ithyxyla Meyrick, 1904
Iulota ochropolia Turner, 1939
Iulota phauloptila Turner, 1919
Iulota triglossa Meyrick, 1904
Leptogeneia bicristata Meyrick, 1904
Proselotis ischnoptila (Turner, 1919)
Pycnobathra achroa (Lower, 1901)
Pycnobathra acromelas (Turner, 1919)
Pycnobathra aenictodes Turner, 1919
Pycnobathra aphileta Meyrick, 1904
Pycnobathra astemphella Meyrick, 1904
Pycnobathra centrosema Meyrick, 1904
Pycnobathra chalcoscia Meyrick, 1904
Pycnobathra clavata Meyrick, 1914
Pycnobathra coniodes Meyrick, 1904
Pycnobathra euxena Meyrick, 1904
Pycnobathra hoplitis Meyrick, 1904
Pycnobathra inficeta Meyrick, 1904
Pycnobathra ischnota Meyrick, 1904
Pycnobathra isotis Meyrick, 1904
Pycnobathra melitopis Meyrick, 1904
Pycnobathra niphodes (Lower, 1897)
Pycnobathra oxyphanes Meyrick, 1904
Pycnobathra pityritis Meyrick, 1904
Pycnobathra platyleuca Meyrick, 1904
Pycnobathra popularis Meyrick, 1904
Pycnobathra sclerotricha Meyrick, 1904
Pycnobathra sematacma Meyrick, 1921
Pycnobathra stratimera (Lower, 1897)
Pyncostola actias (Meyrick, 1904)
Pyncostola sciopola (Meyrick, 1904)
Pyncostola stalactis (Meyrick, 1904)

Chelariinae
Anarsia anisodonta Diakonoff, 1954
Anarsia centrospila (Turner, 1919)
Anarsia dryinopa Lower, 1897
Anarsia epiula Meyrick, 1904
Anarsia hippocoma Meyrick, 1921
Anarsia leucophora Meyrick, 1904
Anarsia molybdota Meyrick, 1904
Anarsia patulella (Walker, 1864)
Anisoplaca bathropis (Meyrick, 1904)
Decatopseustis cataphanes Common, 1958
Decatopseustis xanthastis (Lower, 1896)
Hypatima ammonura (Meyrick, 1921)
Hypatima attenuata (Meyrick, 1920)
Hypatima baliodes (Lower, 1920)
Hypatima cyrtopleura (Turner, 1919)
Hypatima dermatica (Meyrick, 1921)
Hypatima deviella (Walker, 1864)
Hypatima discissa (Meyrick, 1916)
Hypatima euplecta (Meyrick, 1904)
Hypatima harpophora (Meyrick, 1921)
Hypatima metaphorica (Meyrick, 1921)
Hypatima microgramma (Meyrick, 1920)
Hypatima orthostathma (Meyrick, 1921)
Hypatima scotia (Turner, 1919)
Hypatima simulacrella (Meyrick, 1904)
Hypatima spathota (Meyrick, 1913)
Hypatima sphenophora (Meyrick, 1904)
Hypatima tenebrosa (Meyrick, 1920)
Hypatima tessulata (Meyrick, 1921)
Hypatima toreuta (Turner, 1919)
Macracaena adela Common, 1958
Pectinophora endema Common, 1958
Pectinophora gossypiella (Saunders, 1844)
Pectinophora scutigera (Holdaway, 1926)
Pexicopia arenicola Common, 1958
Pexicopia catharia Common, 1958
Pexicopia cryphia Common, 1958
Pexicopia dascia Common, 1958
Pexicopia desmanthes (Lower, 1898)
Pexicopia diasema Common, 1958
Pexicopia dictyomorpha (Lower, 1900)
Pexicopia epactaea (Meyrick, 1904)
Pexicopia euryanthes (Meyrick, 1922)
Pexicopia mimetica Common, 1958
Pexicopia nephelombra (Meyrick, 1904)
Pexicopia paliscia Common, 1958
Pexicopia pheletes Common, 1958
Pexicopia proselia Common, 1958
Pexicopia pycnoda (Lower, 1899)
Pexicopia trimetropis (Meyrick, 1922)
Sitotroga cerealella (Olivier, 1789)

Dichomerinae
Arotria iophaea Meyrick, 1904
Atasthalistis ochreoviridella (Pagenstecher, 1900)
Atasthalistis pyrocosma Meyrick, 1886
Atasthalistis tricolor (R. Felder & Rogenhofer, 1875)
Dichomeris achlyodes (Meyrick, 1904)
Dichomeris acrogypsa Turner, 1919
Dichomeris acuminatus (Staudinger, 1876)
Dichomeris adactella (Walker, 1864)
Dichomeris capnites (Meyrick, 1904)
Dichomeris chalcophaea Meyrick, 1921
Dichomeris cirrhostola Turner, 1919
Dichomeris dryinodes (Lower, 1897)
Dichomeris dysorata Turner, 1919
Dichomeris holomela (Lower, 1897)
Dichomeris iodorus (Meyrick, 1904)
Dichomeris lutivittata Meyrick, 1921
Dichomeris lygropa (Lower, 1903)
Dichomeris melanophylla (Turner, 1919)
Dichomeris melichrous (Meyrick, 1904)
Dichomeris mesoctenis Meyrick, 1921
Dichomeris peristylis (Meyrick, 1904)
Dichomeris pleuroleuca Turner, 1919
Dichomeris pleurophaea (Turner, 1919)
Dichomeris thanatopsis (Lower, 1901)
Dichomeris xuthochyta Turner, 1919
Dichomeris zygophorus (Meyrick, 1904)
Empalactis sporogramma (Meyrick, 1921)
Holaxyra ancylosticha (Turner, 1919)
Hylograptis thryptica Meyrick, 1910
Hyodectis crenoides Meyrick, 1904
Mesophleps apentheta (Turner, 1919)
Mesophleps argonota (Lower, 1901)
Mesophleps chloranthes (Lower, 1900)
Mesophleps crocina (Meyrick, 1904)
Mesophleps cycnobathra (Lower, 1898)
Mesophleps epiochra (Meyrick, 1886)
Mesophleps macrosemus (Lower, 1900)
Mesophleps meliphanes (Lower, 1894)
Mesophleps mylicotis (Meyrick, 1904)
Mesophleps ochroloma (Lower, 1901)
Mesophleps palpigera (Walsingham, 1891)
Mesophleps parvella Li & Sattler, 2012
Mesophleps tephrastis (Meyrick, 1904)
Mesophleps tetrachroa (Lower, 1898)
Mesophleps trichombra (Lower, 1898)
Mesophleps truncatella Li & Sattler, 2012
Myconita plutelliformis (Snellen, 1901)
Nothris mesophracta Turner, 1919
Onebala amethystina (Meyrick, 1904)
Onebala choristis (Meyrick, 1904)
Onebala euargyra (Turner, 1919)
Onebala hibisci (Stainton, 1859)
Onebala iridosoma (Meyrick, 1918)
Onebala zapyrodes (Turner, 1919)
Rhadinophylla siderosema Turner, 1919
Streniastis composita Meyrick, 1922
Streniastis thermaea (Lower, 1897)
Symbolistis argyromitra Meyrick, 1904
Symbolistis orophota Meyrick, 1904
Telephila plasticus (Meyrick, 1904)

Gelechiinae
Australiopalpa bumerang Povolný, 1974
Australiopalpa commoni Povolný, 1974
Australiopalpa tristis Povolný, 1974
Ephysteris promptella (Staudinger, 1859)
Ephysteris silignitis (Turner, 1919)
Ephysteris subdiminutella (Stainton, 1867)
Macrenches clerica (Rosenstock, 1885)
Macrenches eurybatis Meyrick, 1904
Phthorimaea operculella (Zeller, 1873)
Sarotorna eridora Meyrick, 1904
Sarotorna mesoleuca (Lower, 1900)
Sarotorna myrrhina Turner, 1919
Sarotorna stenodes (Turner, 1936)
Scrobipalpa aptatella (Walker, 1864)
Scrobipalpa eschatopis (Meyrick, 1904)
Scrobipalpa leucocephala (Lower, 1893)
Scrobipalpa nonyma (Turner, 1919)
Scrobipalpa pyrrhanthes (Meyrick, 1904)
Smenodoca erebenna Meyrick, 1904
Stegasta allactis Meyrick, 1904
Stegasta cosmodes (Lower, 1899)
Stegasta tenebricosa Turner, 1919
Stegasta variana Meyrick, 1904
Symmetrischema tangolias (Gyen, 1913)
Physoptila termiticola (Turner, 1926)
Ardozyga aclera (Meyrick, 1904)
Ardozyga acrocrossa (Turner, 1947)
Ardozyga acroleuca (Meyrick, 1904)
Ardozyga actinota (Meyrick, 1904)
Ardozyga aeolopis (Meyrick, 1904)
Ardozyga amblopis (Meyrick, 1904)
Ardozyga ananeura (Meyrick, 1904)
Ardozyga annularia (Turner, 1919)
Ardozyga anthracina (Meyrick, 1904)
Ardozyga arenaria (Turner, 1933)
Ardozyga arganthes (Meyrick, 1904)
Ardozyga argocentra (Meyrick, 1904)
Ardozyga aspetodes (Meyrick, 1904)
Ardozyga autopis (Meyrick, 1904)
Ardozyga aversella (Walker, 1864)
Ardozyga banausodes (Meyrick, 1904)
Ardozyga bistrigata (Meyrick, 1921)
Ardozyga caminopis (Meyrick, 1904)
Ardozyga catarrhacta (Meyrick, 1904)
Ardozyga celidophora (Turner, 1919)
Ardozyga cephalota (Meyrick, 1904)
Ardozyga ceramica (Meyrick, 1904)
Ardozyga chalazodes (Turner, 1919)
Ardozyga chenias (Meyrick, 1904)
Ardozyga chionoprora (Turner, 1927)
Ardozyga chiradia (Meyrick, 1904)
Ardozyga cladara (Meyrick, 1904)
Ardozyga compsochroa (Meyrick, 1904)
Ardozyga cosmotis (Meyrick, 1904)
Ardozyga creperrima (Turner, 1919)
Ardozyga crotalodes (Meyrick, 1904)
Ardozyga crypsibatis (Meyrick, 1904)
Ardozyga crypsicneca (Turner, 1927)
Ardozyga cryptosperma (Meyrick, 1921)
Ardozyga decaspila (Lower, 1899)
Ardozyga deltodes (Lower, 1896)
Ardozyga desmatra (Lower, 1897)
Ardozyga diplanetis (Meyrick, 1904)
Ardozyga diplonesa (Meyrick, 1904)
Ardozyga dysclyta (Turner, 1933)
Ardozyga dysphanes (Turner, 1947)
Ardozyga elassopis (Turner, 1919)
Ardozyga elpistis (Meyrick, 1904)
Ardozyga emmeles (Turner, 1933)
Ardozyga enchotypa (Turner, 1919)
Ardozyga englypta (Meyrick, 1904)
Ardozyga eumela (Lower, 1897)
Ardozyga euprepta (Turner, 1933)
Ardozyga euryarga (Turner, 1919)
Ardozyga eustephana (Turner, 1919)
Ardozyga exarista (Meyrick, 1904)
Ardozyga flexilis (Meyrick, 1904)
Ardozyga frugalis (Meyrick, 1904)
Ardozyga furcifera (Turner, 1919)
Ardozyga galactopa (Meyrick, 1916)
Ardozyga glagera (Turner, 1919)
Ardozyga gorgonias (Meyrick, 1904)
Ardozyga gypsocrana (Turner, 1919)
Ardozyga haemaspila (Lower, 1894)
Ardozyga hedana (Turner, 1919)
Ardozyga hilara (Turner, 1919)
Ardozyga hormodes (Meyrick, 1904)
Ardozyga hylias (Meyrick, 1904)
Ardozyga hypocneca (Turner, 1919)
Ardozyga hypoleuca (Meyrick, 1904)
Ardozyga idiospila (Meyrick, 1922)
Ardozyga invalida (Meyrick, 1904)
Ardozyga involuta (Turner, 1919)
Ardozyga iochlaena (Meyrick, 1904)
Ardozyga irobela (Turner, 1947)
Ardozyga ithygramma (Turner, 1933)
Ardozyga liota (Meyrick, 1904)
Ardozyga lithina (Lower, 1899)
Ardozyga loemias (Meyrick, 1904)
Ardozyga loxodesma (Meyrick, 1904)
Ardozyga mechanistis (Meyrick, 1904)
Ardozyga megalommata (Meyrick, 1904)
Ardozyga megalosticta (Turner, 1919)
Ardozyga melicrata (Turner, 1919)
Ardozyga mesochra (Lower, 1894)
Ardozyga mesopsamma (Turner, 1919)
Ardozyga microdora (Meyrick, 1904)
Ardozyga micropa (Meyrick, 1904)
Ardozyga molyntis (Meyrick, 1904)
Ardozyga nephelota (Meyrick, 1904)
Ardozyga neurosticha (Turner, 1933)
Ardozyga nothrodes (Meyrick, 1921)
Ardozyga nyctias (Meyrick, 1904)
Ardozyga obeliscota (Meyrick, 1904)
Ardozyga obscura (Turner, 1933)
Ardozyga ochrobathra (Turner, 1933)
Ardozyga odorifera (Meyrick, 1904)
Ardozyga orthanotos (Lower, 1900)
Ardozyga pacifica (Meyrick, 1904)
Ardozyga pelogenes (Meyrick, 1906)
Ardozyga pelogramma (Meyrick, 1904)
Ardozyga penthicodes (Meyrick, 1921)
Ardozyga phasianis (Meyrick, 1904)
Ardozyga phloeodes (Meyrick, 1904)
Ardozyga plinthactis (Meyrick, 1904)
Ardozyga poenicea (Turner, 1947)
Ardozyga polioxysta (Turner, 1933)
Ardozyga prisca (Meyrick, 1904)
Ardozyga proscripta (Meyrick, 1921)
Ardozyga psephias (Meyrick, 1904)
Ardozyga pyrrhica (Turner, 1919)
Ardozyga sarisias (Meyrick, 1904)
Ardozyga sciodes (Meyrick, 1904)
Ardozyga scytina (Meyrick, 1904)
Ardozyga secta (Meyrick, 1921)
Ardozyga semiographa (Turner, 1919)
Ardozyga sisyraea (Meyrick, 1904)
Ardozyga sodalisella (Walker, 1864)
Ardozyga sporodeta (Turner, 1919)
Ardozyga stratifera (Meyrick, 1904)
Ardozyga subnexella (Walker, 1864)
Ardozyga tabulata (Meyrick, 1904)
Ardozyga taracta (Turner, 1919)
Ardozyga telopis (Meyrick, 1904)
Ardozyga temenitis (Meyrick, 1904)
Ardozyga tetralychna Lower, 1902
Ardozyga tetraploa (Meyrick, 1904)
Ardozyga thanatodes (Lower, 1893)
Ardozyga thermoplaca Lower, 1902
Ardozyga thyridota (Meyrick, 1904)
Ardozyga thyrsoptera (Meyrick, 1904)
Ardozyga trachyphanes (Meyrick, 1904)
Ardozyga trichalina (Meyrick, 1904)
Ardozyga trichosema (Meyrick, 1904)
Ardozyga trichroma (Turner, 1933)
Ardozyga tridecta (Lower, 1900)
Ardozyga trochias (Meyrick, 1921)
Ardozyga tyroessa (Turner, 1933)
Ardozyga vacatella (Walker, 1864)
Ardozyga voluta (Meyrick, 1904)
Ardozyga xanthocephala (Meyrick, 1904)
Ardozyga xestolitha (Meyrick, 1904)
Ardozyga xuthias (Meyrick, 1904)
Corynaea dilechria Turner, 1919
Craspedotis diasticha Turner, 1919
Craspedotis pragmatica Meyrick, 1904
Craspedotis soloeca Meyrick, 1904
Craspedotis thinodes Meyrick, 1904
Ephelictis megalarthra Meyrick, 1904
Ephelictis neochalca Meyrick, 1904
Epibrontis hemichlaena (Lower, 1897)
Epibrontis pallacopa Meyrick, 1922
Epimimastis catopta Turner, 1919
Epimimastis porphyroloma (Lower, 1897)
Epimimastis tegminata Meyrick, 1916
Hemiarcha bleptodes Turner, 1919
Hemiarcha caliginosa Turner, 1919
Hemiarcha macroplaca (Lower, 1893)
Hemiarcha metableta Turner, 1933
Hemiarcha tetrasticta Turner, 1919
Hemiarcha thermochroa (Lower, 1893)
Oncerozancla euopa Turner, 1933
Orthoptila abruptella (Walker, 1864)
Pancoenia pelota Meyrick, 1904
Pancoenia periphora Meyrick, 1904
Pancoenia pygmaea Turner, 1919
Phaeotypa stenochorda (Turner, 1933)
Sphaleractis epiclysta Meyrick, 1920
Sphaleractis eurysema Meyrick, 1904
Sphaleractis parasticta Meyrick, 1904
Sphaleractis platyleuca (Lower, 1897)
Tanycyttara xanthomochla Turner, 1933
Tritadelpha microptila Meyrick, 1904

The following species belongs to the subfamily Gelechiinae, but has not been assigned to a genus yet. Given here is the original name given to the species when it was first described:
Gelechia anthochra Lower, 1896
Phthorimaea chersochlora Meyrick, 1922
Barea ectadia Turner, 1935
Trachyntis epipona Meyrick, 1902
Phthorimaea frequens Meyrick, 1921
Psoricoptera melanoptila Lower, 1897
Hemiarcha polioleuca Turner, 1919
Gelechia callicoma Lower, 1897
Gelechia cannanella Lower, 1897
Borkhausenia catochopis Meyrick, 1920
Copidostola dimorpha Lower, 1897
Gelechia heliochrysa Lower, 1897
Ypsolophus inodes Lower, 1897
Gelechia lividella Lower, 1897
Gelechia marmoratella Walker, 1864
Paltodora orthocrossa Lower, 1897
Gelechia petrodes Lower, 1897
Phyllocnistis spilota Turner, 1947

Sources
Gelechiinae at Australian Faunal Directory

Australia
Gelechiidae